SFT2 domain containing 2 is a protein that in humans is encoded by the SFT2D2 gene.

References

Further reading